Nannopus is a genus of copepods belonging to the family Nannopodidae.

The species of this genus are found in Europe, Japan and Northern America.

Species:
 Nannopus brasiliensis Jakobi, 1956
 Nannopus bulbiseta Vakati & W.Lee, 2017
 Nannopus didelphis Fiers & Kotwicki, 2013
 Nannopus dimorphicus Vakati & W.Lee, 2017
 Nannopus ganghwaensis Vakati, Kihara & W.Lee, 2017
 Nannopus hirsutus Fiers & Kotwicki, 2013
 Nannopus minutus Vakati & W.Lee, 2017
 Nannopus palustris Brady, 1880
 Nannopus parvipilis Kim, J.G., Choi & Yoon, 2017
 Nannopus parvus Vakati & W.Lee, 2017
 Nannopus perplexus (Sars G.O., 1909)
 Nannopus procerus Fiers & Kotwicki, 2013
 Nannopus scaldicola Fiers & Kotwicki, 2013
 Nannopus serratus Vakati & W.Lee, 2017
 Nannopus unisegmentatus Shen & Tai, 1964

References

Harpacticoida
Copepod genera